Alfred Edward "Ted" Ringwood FRS FAA (19 April 1930 – 12 November 1993) was an Australian experimental geophysicist and geochemist, and the 1988 recipient of the Wollaston Medal.

The mineral ringwoodite is named after him.

Early life and study
Ringwood was born in Kew, only child of Alfred Edward Ringwood. He attended Hawthorn West State School where he played cricket and Australian Rules football. In 1943 he was successful in gaining a scholarship to Geelong Grammar School where he boarded. On matriculation, he enrolled in Geology a science degree at the University of Melbourne where he held a Commonwealth Government Scholarship, and was awarded a resident scholarship at Trinity College. He represented the college and the university in football. He obtained First Class Honours degree in Geology and began a MSc degree in field-mapping and petrology of the Devonian Snowy River volcanics of northeastern Victoria, graduating with Honours in 1953. Ringwood then undertook a PhD, beginning an experimental study about the origin of metalliferous ore deposits, but later changed his research topic so as to apply geochemistry to an understanding of the structure of the Earth, in particular the mineralogical constitution of the Earth's mantle.

Germanate and earth's mantle
In the late 1950s and 1960s Ringwood worked on germanates. He discovered that they served as low-pressure analogue to high-pressure silicates. With this insight he was able to predict that the phase changes of the mantle minerals olivine and pyroxene should occur in the Transition Zone. At the Australian National University he began experimental study of silicates at high pressure, and in 1959 demonstrated that the iron end-member of olivine indeed transformed to the denser spinel structure, as did numerous germanate and germanate-silicate solid solutions.

In 1969 a new mineral was discovered in fragments of the Tenham meteorite which had the same crystal structure as the high pressure spinel polymorph of olivine. This was the first time that Ringwood's predicted polymorph was found in nature. Honouring the importance of Ringwood's work the mineral was named ringwoodite. A team from the University of Alberta have isolated terrestrial ringwoodite in a brown diamond specimen found in Brazil in 2008. Their research suggests the presence of water deep within the Earth's mantle.

Later life
In 1978, his ANU team invented synroc, a possible means of safely storing and disposing of radioactive waste.

Ringwood died of lymphoma on 12 November 1993 at the age of 63.

Honours
Ringwood received numerous honours and awards for his work.
 1993 Jaeger Medal
 1993 Harry H. Hess Medal
 1992 Clarke Medal
 1991 Feltrinelli Prize
 1991 V. M. Goldschmidt Award
 1988 Wollaston Medal
 1985 Arthur Holmes Medal
 1978 Matthew Flinders Medal and Lecture
 1975 Mueller Medal
 1974 Arthur L. Day Medal
 1974 William Bowie Medal
 1972 Werner medal

Fellowships
1966 Fellow of the Australian Academy of Science (FAA)
1969 Fellow, American Geophysical Union
1972 Fellow of the Royal Society of London (FRS)
1972 Fellow, Meteoritical Society
1983 Honorary Foreign Fellow, European Union of Geosciences

The European Association of Geochemistry quinquennially awards a Science Innovation Award medal named in his honour for work in petrology and mineral physics.

Selected publications

References

Further reading
A.E. Ringwood biography
A.E. Ringwood biography at ANU, Canberra
Earth has a secret reservoir of water, scientists say
'Ringwoodite' points to water deep within Earth

1930 births
1993 deaths
People educated at Geelong Grammar School
People educated at Trinity College (University of Melbourne)
Fellows of the Royal Society
Wollaston Medal winners
Australian geochemists
Fellows of the Australian Academy of Science
Australian geophysicists
Foreign associates of the National Academy of Sciences
Scientists from Melbourne
People from Kew, Victoria
Recipients of the V. M. Goldschmidt Award